Agallissini is a tribe of beetles in the subfamily Cerambycinae, containing the following genera and species:

 Genus Agallissus
 Agallissus lepturoides (Chevrolat in Orbigny, 1844)
 Agallissus melaniodes Dalman, 1823
 Genus Osmopleura
 Osmopleura chamaeropis (Horn, 1893)
 Genus Zagymnus
 Zagymnus clerinus (LeConte, 1873)
 Zagymnus rugicollis Chemsak & Linsley, 1968
 Zagymnus variatus Chemsak & Linsley, 1968

References

 
Polyphaga tribes